Oetrange railway station is a railway station serving Oetrange, in the commune of Contern, in southern Luxembourg.  It is operated by Chemins de Fer Luxembourgeois, the state-owned railway company.

The station is situated on Line 30, which connects Luxembourg City to the east of the country and Trier.

External links

 Official CFL page on Oetrange station
 Rail.lu page on Oetrange station

Contern
Railway stations in Luxembourg
Railway stations on CFL Line 30